Long Whatton is a village and former civil parish, now in the parish of Long Whatton and Diseworth, in the North West Leicestershire district, in the English county of Leicestershire. It is south of East Midlands Airport, off Junctions 23 and 23A of the M1 motorway, and has easy access to Loughborough via the A6 and to Shepshed, Ashby-de-la-Zouch and Kegworth.

Geography
It is near the Charnwood Forest, in the northern division of the county, West Goscote hundred, rural deanery of Akeley, Loughborough Union and County Court district. The village is clean and well built, several of the houses being modern, and is situated on the south bank of a small rivulet.

The population of Long Whatton as of 2011 was 1,124.

Long Whatton History Society is participating in the setting up of a local heritage centre with the Diseworth Heritage Trust.

Places to visit in Long Whatton
Whatton House and Gardens
Manor Organic Farm, Farm Shop and Tearoom
Long Whatton Post Office and Shop

Amenities
The public houses are the Royal Oak and the Falcon; the Royal Oak has an entry in the 2012 Campaign for Real Ale Good Beer Guide.

Long Whatton has three churches: Long Whatton All Saints Church, Long Whatton Methodist Church and Long Whatton Baptist Church. Between 1998 and 2005 an annual Mission Aviation Fellowship Midlands Rally took place in the Methodist Church. Due to a loss of funding, the Baptist Church sadly closed in 2016. 

Long Whatton has a primary school, a farm shop and a village store.

Community activities

Long Whatton hosts a village show every August Bank Holiday.

Long Whatton has a Scout troop and a Brownie pack.

Long Whatton has a cricket club and a football team.

Civil parish 
On 1 April 1936 the parish of Diseworth was merged with Long Whatton, parts of Hathern and Shepshed was also merged, on 4 August 1999 the parish was renamed "Long Whatton & Diseworth". In 1931 the parish of Long Whatton (prior to the merge) had a population of 587.

Gallery

References

External links

 Welcome to Long Whatton

Villages in Leicestershire
Former civil parishes in Leicestershire
North West Leicestershire District